Anonity was an  coastal tanker which was built in 1945 for the Ministry of War Transport (MoWT) as Empire Campden. She was sold in 1947 and renamed Anonity. In 1966, she was sold and renamed Petrola II. A further sale in 1969 saw her renamed Kalymnos. She ran aground in April 1970 and was scrapped the following month.

Description
The ship was built by A& J Inglis Ltd, Glasgow as yard number 1300. She was launched on 30 April 1945 and completed in August 1943.

Her GRT was 890 and she had a NRT of 379. Her DWT was 900.

She was propelled by a 2-stroke Single Cycle Single Action diesel engine which had four cylinders of  diameter by  stroke. The engine was built by British Polar Engines Ltd, Glasgow.

History
Empire Campden was built for the MoWT. She was placed under the management of the Anglo-Saxon Petroleum Co Ltd. Her port of registry was Glasgow. The Code Letters GFFG were allocated. Her Official Number was 169447.

In 1947, Empire Campden was sold to F T Everard & Co Ltd and renamed Anonity. Her port of registry was changed to London. She served with Everard's until 1966 when she was sold to John S Lastis, Greece and renamed Petrola II. In 1969, she was sold to P C Chrissochoides and renamed Kalymnos. Her port of registry was changed to Piraeus. On 12 April 1970, she ran aground off Rhodes and was declared a constructive total loss. Kalymnos was refloated and towed to Piraeus. She was sold on 25 May 1970 to D. Vittiotis & Salmina, Piraeus for scrap.

References

External links

1945 ships
Ships built on the River Clyde
Oil tankers
Ministry of War Transport ships
Empire ships
World War II tankers
Merchant ships of the United Kingdom
Cargo ships of Greece
Maritime incidents in 1970
Ships built by Harland and Wolff